Copella vilmae is a species of fish in the splashing tetra family found in the upper Amazon basin. They grow no more than a few centimeters.

References

External links
 

Lebiasinidae
Taxa named by Jacques Géry
Fish described in 1963